Topleț is a commune in Caraș-Severin County, western Romania with a population of 2923 people. It is composed of two villages, Bârza (Börza) and Topleț.

Natives
 Ioan Talpeș

References

Communes in Caraș-Severin County
Localities in Romanian Banat